Rostislav Grigor'yevich Boyko (1 August 1931, Leningrad – 18 November 2002, Moscow), sometimes transliterated Rostislaw Grigorjewitsch Boiko, was a Russian composer and conductor. He was principally active in both occupations within the area of choral music. He produced more than 100 choral works; most of which have been published and recorded. He also composed three symphonies, four operas, many art songs for solo voice, and some works for solo piano.

Education and career
Boyko was educated at the St. Petersburg State Academic Capella (1939–1944) and the Moscow Choral School (1944–1950) before he pursued graduate studies at the Moscow Conservatory with Aram Khachaturian and Vladimir Pavlovič Stepanov. He graduated from the latter institution in 1957 with degrees in choral conducting and music composition. 

Boyko was principally active as a choral composer, publishing 80 choral opuses before 1983. His choral music, often inspired by Russian folk songs and poetry, were championed by conductor Yevgeny Svetlanov who recorded many of his works. Particularly successful among his choral works are his settings of verses by Alexander Pushkin (1978) and his romances and songs set to poems by Sergei Yesenin (1969, 1972, 1976), Heinrich Heine (1974, 1976, 1982), and Avetik Isahakyan (1983). His Symphony No. 2 was given its United States premiere in 1990 by the Tucson Symphony Orchestra. 

In 1977 he was named a People's Artist of the USSR and in 1982 he was the recipient of the USSR State Prize.

Boyko died on 18 November 2002 in Moscow.

References

1931 births
2002 deaths
Moscow Conservatory alumni
People's Artists of the USSR
Russian composers
Russian conductors (music)

de:Rostislaw Grigorjewitsch Boiko